John Francis Fleming (26 August 1881 – 9 January 1965) was a British sport shooter who competed at the 1908 Summer Olympics.

In the 1908 Olympics he won a gold medal in the moving target small-bore rifle event and was 9th in the disappearing target small-bore rifle event.

References

External links
profile

1881 births
1965 deaths
British male sport shooters
ISSF rifle shooters
Olympic shooters of Great Britain
Shooters at the 1908 Summer Olympics
Olympic gold medallists for Great Britain
Olympic medalists in shooting
Medalists at the 1908 Summer Olympics
19th-century British people
20th-century British people